Pontefract Museum is a local museum in Pontefract, West Yorkshire, England. The collections cover archaeology, archives, decorative and applied art, fine art, photographs and social history.

History 
The museum is located in an Art Nouveau building in the middle of the town which was originally a Carnegie library.  The library was opened in 1904 and designed by George Pennington. 
In 1975, a new library was built and the Carnegie building was converted into a museum.  It retains a tiled entrance hall and original 1904 furnishings.

Collections 
Exhibits include information on Pontefract Castle and Pontefract Cakes (liquorice sweets). Exhibits include finds from Pontefract Castle and St. John's Priory, Pontefract, coins from the English Civil War, packaging from the Pontefract liquorice factories, coloured glass and locally printed material. Most of the collection has Pontefract connections, including the mining history of the town.

See also
Listed buildings in Pontefract

References

External links
 Pontefract Museum - official site

Library buildings completed in 1904
Buildings and structures in the City of Wakefield
Tourist attractions in the City of Wakefield
Art Nouveau architecture in England
Museums with year of establishment missing
Carnegie libraries in England
Former library buildings in England
Museums in West Yorkshire
Local museums in West Yorkshire
Listed buildings in Pontefract